Pseudonebularia connectens is a species of sea snail, a marine gastropod mollusk, in the family Mitridae, the miters or miter snails.

Distribution
This marine species occurs off Papua New Guinea.

References

External links
 Dautzenberg, P. & Bouge, L. J. (1923). Mitridés de la Nouvelle-Calédonie et de ses dépendances. Journal de Conchyliologie. 67(2): 83-159 [15 February 1923; 67(3): 179-259, pl. 2]
 Fedosov A., Puillandre N., Herrmann M., Kantor Yu., Oliverio M., Dgebuadze P., Modica M.V. & Bouchet P. (2018). The collapse of Mitra: molecular systematics and morphology of the Mitridae (Gastropoda: Neogastropoda). Zoological Journal of the Linnean Society. 183(2): 253-337

connectens
Gastropods described in 1923